Fatma Suleymanova (born 23 December 1912, Shusha, Russian Empire - died 2 December 1978, Baku, Azerbaijan SSR) was a doctor of technical sciences (1964), professor (1967), laureate of the Azerbaijan SSR State Prize (1970), and honored inventor of the USSR (1979).

Life 
After graduating from the Leningrad Highway Institute (1934), he worked in various positions in the system of the Ministry of Road Transport of Azerbaijan. He worked as a laboratory director at the Oil and Chemical Processes (1952–1965) and Chemical Additives Institutes (1965–1970) of the Azerbaijan National Academy of Sciences, and from 1970 he worked as the head of the automobile department at the Azerbaijan Polytechnic Institute. His research is mainly in the field of motor fuel and oils. He received 15 authorship certificates. He was awarded the "Red Banner of Labor" and "Order of the Badge of Honour". She died in Baku in 1978.

Awards 
 Laureate of the Azerbaijan SSR State Prize (1970).
 "Red Banner of Labor". 
 "Order of the Badge of Honour".

References

Sources 
 

1912 births
1978 deaths
Recipients of the Order of Lenin
Azerbaijani chemists
Scientists from Shusha